Bleddyn Fardd (fl. c. 1258 – 1284) was a Welsh-language court poet from Gwynedd.

Bleddyn is noted for his elegies on the death of Llywelyn ap Gruffudd, Prince of Wales, the texts of which are preserved in the Hendregadredd manuscript.

References

Welsh-language poets
13th-century Welsh poets
Year of birth uncertain
1284 deaths